Doca may refer to:

Doca (player), full name Alfredo "Doca" de Almeida Rego (1903-????), Brazilian national football (soccer) layer
Doca (singer), part of the duo Cidinho and Doca
DOCa, abbreviation for Denominación de Origen
DOCA, abbreviation for 11-deoxycorticosterone acetate
 Tia Doca (1932–2009), Brazilian samba dancer

See also
Zé Doca, municipality in the state of Maranhão in the Northeast region of Brazil